The BMW HH is an open-wheel Formula 2 racing car produced between 1947 and 1950 by German automobile manufacturer BMW.

History
In 1947, following the creation of the Formula 2 racing category by the FIA, different BMW HH47, HH48, and HH49 versions of single-seaters were designed by Herman Holbein (former head of BMW's chassis development department).

References

Formula Two cars
BMW racing cars
BMW in Formula One